Haqi Osman (born 11 April 2002), is a Ghanaian professional footballer who plays as a winger for TFF First League club Çaykur Rizespor on loan from Yeni Malatyaspor.

Professional career
Osman began his career with the Ghanaian club Planners Athletic Club, and transferred to the Turkish club Yeni Malatyaspor on 1 February 2021. He made his professional debut with Yeni Malatyaspor in a 5–1 Süper Lig loss to Trabzonspor on 16 August 2021.

References

External links
 

2002 births
Living people
People from Koforidua
Ghanaian footballers
Yeni Malatyaspor footballers
Süper Lig players
Association football wingers
Ghanaian expatriate footballers
Ghanaian expatriate sportspeople in Turkey
Expatriate footballers in Turkey